Dubrava Križovljanska  is a village in Croatia, near the border with Slovenia. It is connected by the D2 highway.

Populated places in Varaždin County